Susana Antón (born August 19, 1947) is an Argentine composer and teacher.

Born in Guaymallén Department, Anton studied at the music school of the National University of Cuyo, where her teachers included Miguel Francese and Elifio Rosaenz; she also studied under Jorge Fontenla and Eduardo Tejeda and had lessons in electronic music with Francisco Kröpfl. During her career she has taught at her alma mater and at the National University of San Juan. Her output encompasses several large-scale works, but she has been active as well in the field of chamber music.

References

1947 births
Living people
Argentine classical composers
Women classical composers
20th-century Argentine musicians
20th-century classical composers
21st-century Argentine musicians
21st-century classical composers
National University of Cuyo alumni
Academic staff of the National University of San Juan
Academic staff of the National University of Cuyo
People from Mendoza Province
20th-century women composers
21st-century women composers
Argentine women composers